Sial is a village in the Khyber Pakhtunkhwa province of Pakistan. It is located 32 km from Abbottabad city. Its boundaries touch with (Jinkiar) Mansehra District. Its population is around 1000 many of its inhabitants have moved to Karachi, Lahore and Islamabad.

Populated places in Abbottabad District